Miriam Nelson may refer to:

 Miriam E. Nelson (born 1960), social entrepreneur and author
 Miriam Nelson (choreographer) (1919–2018), American choreographer, dancer, and actress